Poland competed at the 2004 Summer Olympics in Athens, Greece, from 13 to 29 August 2004. This was the nation's eighteenth appearance at the Summer Olympics, except the 1984 Summer Olympics in Los Angeles, because of the Soviet boycott. The Polish Olympic Committee (PKO) sent a total of 194 athletes to the Games, 132 men and 62 women, to compete in 21 sports. Men's volleyball was the only team-based sport in which Poland had its representation in these Olympic Games. There was only a single competitor in women's taekwondo.

The Polish team featured six defending Olympic champions from Sydney: race walker Robert Korzeniowski, rifle shooter Renata Mauer-Różańska, rowing pair Tomasz Kucharski and Robert Sycz, and hammer throwers Kamila Skolimowska, and Szymon Ziółkowski. Greco-Roman wrestler and 1996 Olympic champion Ryszard Wolny and sprint canoeist Michał Śliwiński (previously competed for the Soviet Union, Unified Team, and Ukraine) had made their fifth Olympic appearance as the most sophisticated athletes of the team. Show jumper Grzegorz Kubiak, aged 41, was the oldest athlete of the team, while rhythmic gymnast Martyna Dąbkowska was the youngest at age 15. Swimming star Bartosz Kizierowski, who finished fifth in Sydney four years earlier in the men's 50 m freestyle, became the nation's flag bearer in the opening ceremony.

Poland left Athens with a total of ten medals, three golds, two silver, and five bronze, the lowest in Summer Olympic history since 1956. Seven of these medals were dominated by women, who constituted less than a third of all Polish athletes at these Games. Among the nation's medalists, two of them climbed the Olympic podium for the first time: Anna Rogowska, who beat her teammate Monika Pyrek to take home the bronze in women's pole vault, and Otylia Jędrzejczak, who became the most decorated Polish athlete at these Games with three medals, including the nation's first gold in swimming. Kucharski and Sycz managed to repeat their golden streak in the men's double sculls, while Korzeniowski ended an illustrious Olympic career with a historic milestone as the first athlete to defend his Olympic title in men's 50 km race walk for the third consecutive time.

Medalists

|  style="text-align:left; width:72%; vertical-align:top;"|

|  style="text-align:left; width:23%; vertical-align:top;"|

Archery

Four Polish archers qualified each for the men's and women's individual archery, and a spot for the women's team.

Athletics

Polish athletes have so far achieved qualifying standards in the following athletics events (up to a maximum of 3 athletes in each event at the 'A' Standard, and 1 at the 'B' Standard).

Men
Track & road events

Field events

Women
Track & road events

Field events

Combined events – Heptathlon

Badminton

Boxing

Poland sent three boxers to Athens.

Canoeing

Slalom

Sprint
Men

Women

Qualification Legend: Q = Qualify to final; q = Qualify to semifinal

Cycling

Road
Men

Women

Track
Sprint

Time trial

Keirin

Mountain biking

Equestrian

Eventing

Show jumping

Fencing

Men

Women

Gymnastics

Rhythmic

Judo

Six Polish judoka (four men and two women) qualified for the 2004 Summer Olympics.

Men

Women

Modern pentathlon

Four Polish athletes qualified to compete in the modern pentathlon event through the European and UIPM Championships.

Rowing

Polish rowers qualified the following boats:

Men

Women

Qualification Legend: FA=Final A (medal); FB=Final B (non-medal); FC=Final C (non-medal); FD=Final D (non-medal); FE=Final E (non-medal); FF=Final F (non-medal); SA/B=Semifinals A/B; SC/D=Semifinals C/D; SE/F=Semifinals E/F; R=Repechage

Sailing

Polish sailors have qualified one boat for each of the following events.

Men

Women

Open

M = Medal race; OCS = On course side of the starting line; DSQ = Disqualified; DNF = Did not finish; DNS= Did not start; RDG = Redress given

Shooting

Five Polish shooters (two men and three women) qualified to compete in the following events:

Men

Women

Swimming

Polish swimmers earned qualifying standards in the following events (up to a maximum of 2 swimmers in each event at the A-standard time, and 1 at the B-standard time):

Men

Women

Table tennis

Two Polish table tennis players qualified for the following events.

Taekwondo

Poland has qualified a single taekwondo jin.

Tennis

Poland nominated two male tennis players to compete in the tournament.

Volleyball

Men's tournament

Roster

Group play

Quarterfinal

Weightlifting

Seven Polish weightlifters qualified for the following events:

Men

Women

Wrestling

Men's freestyle

Men's Greco-Roman

See also
 Poland at the 2004 Summer Paralympics

References

External links
Official Report of the XXVIII Olympiad
Polish Olympic Committee 

Nations at the 2004 Summer Olympics
2004
Summer Olympics